is a Japanese animation and sound director.

Career
Mizushima was born in Chitose, Hokkaido and raised in Hata, Nagano (now Matsumoto, Nagano). He produced independent films in high school and when he graduated from Nagano Prefectural Matsumoto Misuzugaoka High School, he wanted to be a music teacher but gave up on higher education due to being out of work, so he got a job at Shin-Ei Animation in 1986. His initial aspirations later led him to write lyrics and music. His first animation works were Doraemon and Keshiki Cutter where he served as a production assistant. After working on Mami the Psychic and Chimpui, he was in charge of episode direction for the first time in 1991 with episode 120 of Oishinbo. Because of his selfishness in Oishinbo (according to him), he fell into company-internal unemployment. After being demoted to production assistance, he was in charge of Dorami-chan: Hello, Dynosis Kids!! before being hired by then-director Mitsuru Hongo as assistant unit director for the 1994 film Crayon Shin-chan: The Hidden Treasure of the Buri Buri Kingdom, despite the objections of others. As a result, he participated in the Crayon Shin-chan TV series in that same year. The first time he was involved in scriptwriting was for the TV special Sekizō no Ongaeshi da zo, which aired on December 25, 1998, and also served as its storyboard artist and unit director.

He made his directorial debut in 1999 with the film Crayon Shin-chan: Explosion! The Hot Spring's Feel Good Final Battle, while the first TV series he directed was 2001's Haré+Guu. He has also assisted Takashi Ikehata with his works under the pseudonym . He left Shin-Ei Animation on August 20, 2004, and since then has been working as a freelance director for J.C.Staff, P.A.Works and Production I.G, among others.

In December 2013, he won the Individual Award at the 18th Animation Kobe Awards. The reason for this award is that his first original work Girls und Panzer was picked up by various media outlets as an example of "town revitalization through anime", and his versatility in creating a wide range of projects, from gag anime to serious works and adolescent dramas, as well as writing lyrics and music himself.

According to Kiyoshi Tane, the supervisor of the now defunct magazine Otona Anime, Mizushima was one of the busiest anime directors in Japan in 2015, and especially since 2010, he is an all-rounder who has successfully produced a wide range of original anime in a wide variety of genres, as well as two original hits like Girls und Panzer and Shirobako. On the other hand, it can be said that he is so dexterous that it is difficult to see his creativity, but Mizushima's auteurism lies in the spirit of service that focuses on the customers, which has broken through to a level that no one else can imitate.

In October 2022, Kadokawa announced an original anime television series directed by Mizushima titled Shūmatsu Train Doko e Iku?.

Works (as director)

Anime television series
Haré+Guu
xxxHOLiC
Kujibiki Unbalance
xxxHolic: Kei
Kemeko Deluxe!
Big Windup!
Squid Girl
You're Being Summoned, Azazel
Blood-C
Another
Joshiraku
Girls und Panzer
Genshiken Nidaime
Witch Craft Works
Shirobako
Prison School
The Lost Village
The Magnificent Kotobuki
Shūmatsu Train Doko e Iku

OVA
Bludgeoning Angel Dokuro-Chan
Girls und Panzer: This Is the Real Anzio Battle!
Magical Witch Punie-chan
Mudazumo Naki Kaikaku
+Tic Elder Sister
Another

Film
Girls und Panzer der Film (2015)
Girls und Panzer das Finale (2017–present)
Shirobako: The Movie (2020)
The Magnificent Kotobuki Complete Edition (2020)

References

External links
 
 

Anime directors
1965 births
Living people
People from Chitose, Hokkaido
People from Matsumoto, Nagano